Headline Trese was a Filipino language afternoon newscast of IBC 13. It was previously a latenight news program and Originally anchored by TG Kintanar and Risa Hontiveros, it aired from November 27, 1989, to March 6, 1992, replacing Balita sa IBC Huling Ulat and Bantay Balita and was replaced by IBC News 5:30 Report and IBC News 11 O'Clock Report and it returned as an afternoon news program from August 18, 1997, to July 10, 1998, replacing IBC TV X-Press and was replaced by IBC Express Balita. Amy Godinez-Cuenco, Elmer Mercado and Karen Bayhon serves as the final anchors.

Anchors
TG Kintanar (1989-1990)
Risa Hontiveros (1989-1990)
Lee Andres (1990-1992)
Vince Alingod (1990-1992)
Yna Feredo-Yulo (1990-1992)
Amy Godinez-Cuenco (1997-1998)
Elmer Mercado (1997-1998)
Karen Bayhon (1997-1998)

See also
List of programs aired by Intercontinental Broadcasting Corporation
IBC News and Public Affairs

References

Intercontinental Broadcasting Corporation news shows
IBC News and Public Affairs
Intercontinental Broadcasting Corporation original programming
1980s Philippine television series
1990s Philippine television series
1989 Philippine television series debuts
1992 Philippine television series endings
1997 Philippine television series debuts
1998 Philippine television series endings
Filipino-language television shows
Philippine television news shows